The Citizen Initiative for Development was a political party in Morocco.

History and profile
The party was founded in 2002.

In the parliamentary election, held on 7 September 2007, the party did win 1 out of 325 seats. It was dissolved and merged into the Authenticity and Modernity Party in 2008.

References

2002 establishments in Morocco
2008 disestablishments in Morocco
Political parties established in 2002
Political parties disestablished in 2008
Defunct political parties in Morocco